State Road 402 (NM 402) is a  state highway in the US state of New Mexico. NM 402's southern terminus is at U.S. Route 54 (US 54) in Nara Visa, and the northern terminus is at US 56 in Clayton.

Major intersections

See also

References

402
Transportation in Quay County, New Mexico
Transportation in Union County, New Mexico